Zhechev, female form Zhecheva, is a Bulgarian surname.

Notable people with this surname include:
 Dobromir Zhechev (born 1942), Bulgarian footballer
 Lyudmila Andonova-Zhecheva (born 1960), Bulgarian high jumper
 Nikolay Zhechev (born 1974), Bulgarian footballer

Bulgarian-language surnames